Colcapirhua (in Hispanicized spelling) or Qullqapirwa (Quechua) is the fifth municipal section of the Quillacollo Province in the Cochabamba Department, Bolivia. Its seat is Colcapirhua.

Cantons 
The municipality is divided into two cantons. They are (their seats in parentheses):
 Colcapirhua Canton - (Colcapirhua)
 Santa Rosa Canton - (Santa Rosa)

References 

 Instituto Nacional de Estadistica de Bolivia

Municipalities of the Cochabamba Department